Payena leerii is a tree in the family Sapotaceae. The bark is greyish brown. Inflorescences bear up to eight flowers. The tree is a source of high-quality gutta-percha. Habitat is coastal lowland forests from sea-level to  altitude. P. leerii is found widely in Sumatra, Peninsular Malaysia, Borneo and the Philippines.

References

leerii
Trees of Sumatra
Trees of Peninsular Malaysia
Trees of Borneo
Trees of the Philippines
Plants described in 1854